Euchroea is a genus of beetles of the family Scarabaeidae and subfamily Cetoniinae. It originates in Madagascar.

Species

 Euchroea abdominalis Gory & Percheron, 1835
 Euchroea anthracina Brancsik, 1892
 Euchroea auripigmenta Gory & Percheron, 1835
 Euchroea aurora Burmeister, 1842
 Euchroea aurostellata Fairmaire, 1898
 Euchroea clementi Kunckel D'Herculais, 1887
 Euchroea coelestis Burmeister, 1842
 Euchroea desmaresti Gory & Percheron, 1833
 Euchroea episcopalis Guérin-Méneville, 1832
 Euchroea flavoguttata Waterhouse, 1882
 Euchroea guerlachi Guerlach, 2003
 Euchroea histrionica Burmeister, 1842
 Euchroea multiguttata Burmeister, 1842
 Euchroea nigra Pouillaude, 1915
 Euchroea nigrostellata Janson 1924
 Euchroea oberthuri Fairmaire, 1898

References
  Biolib
 Global species

External links 
 Euchroea from Madagascar

Cetoniinae